The Mercedes-Benz M21 engine is a naturally-aspirated, 2.0-liter, straight-6, internal combustion piston engine, designed, developed and produced by Mercedes-Benz; between 1933 and 1936.

M21 Engine
The stated top speed was 98 km/h (61 mph) for the standard length and 95 km/h (59 mph) for the long bodied cars. Power from the engine passed to the rear wheels through a four-speed manual transmission in which the top gear was effectively an overdrive ratio. The top two ratios featured synchromesh. The brakes operated on all four wheels via a hydraulic linkage.

During the model's final year, Mercedes-Benz announced, in June 1936, the option of a more powerful 2,229 cc  engine, which was seen as a necessary response to criticism of the car's leisurely performance in long bodied form.

Applications
Mercedes-Benz W21

References

Mercedes-Benz engines
Straight-six engines
Engines by model
Gasoline engines by model